"Made for Lovin' You" is a song recorded by American recording artist Anastacia for her debut album Not That Kind (2000). It was released as the album's fourth and final single on June 25, 2001, by Daylight Records and Epic Records. The song was used in the United Kingdom for a Honda advertising campaign.

Critical reception
Tricia Beoy of MTVAsia.com compared this song: "with its synthetic bass lines is another track also streaked with Whitney Houston overtones."

Composition 
Written in the key of D♯, "Made For Lovin' You" is mainly based on the chord progression A♯m–G♯–D♯, going to F every 6 bars. Opening with a distorted whispering voice, the song features a heavy synth bassline, with other sounds including a basic keyboard and brass hits. The bridge's chord sequence changes to G♯–D♯–A♯, before building up to the final chorus. The Tin Tin Out mix includes a break in the final chorus in which all the instruments except percussion drop out for 8 bars, leaving the vocals reminiscent of a gospel choir. The song ends with a fade-out.

Music video
The video consists of several live performances Anastacia has given since her debut. It is a montage with scenes from Rock am Ring, a music festival from Germany where Anastacia performed in 2001. Then you can see scenes from a concert she gave in the Netherlands and one she gave in the UK, as well as some other public appearances.

Track listing
 United Kingdom
"Made For Lovin' You" – 3:35
"Made For Lovin' You" (Tin Tin Out Radio Mix) – 3:52
"Underdog" – 4:57
"Made For Lovin' You" (Video)

 UK Cassette Single
"Made For Lovin' You" – 3:35
"Made For Lovin' You" (Tin Tin Out Radio Mix) – 3:52
"Underdog" – 4:57

 France
"Made For Lovin' You" – 3:35
"I Ask Of You" – 4:27

Spain

 "Made For Lovin' You" – 3:35
 "I'm Outta Love" (Hex Hector Radio Edit) – 4:01

Remixes
Album Version – 3:35
Tin Tin Out Radio Mix – 3:52
ATFC Instrumental
ATFC Vocal Mix – 7:40

Charts

Release history

References

2000 songs
2001 singles
Anastacia songs
Songs written by Anastacia
Songs written by Louis Biancaniello
Songs written by Sam Watters
Daylight Records singles
Epic Records singles